The National University of Pilar (Acronym: UNP) is a Paraguayan national and public university with a range of degree offerings. The main campus is located in the capital of the Ñeembucú Department, the city of Pilar. It was founded in 1991 and created by law in 1994.

Branches
Apart from its main campus in Pilar, it operates in three cities of the neighbour Misiones Department: San Ignacio, San Juan Bautista and Ayolas. Also, in Asunción, a subsidiary operates in the premises of the Institute of Comparative Studies in Criminal and Social Sciences of Paraguay (INECIP-Py) thanks to an inter-institutional cooperation agreement.

Academics
The university has seven faculties:
Faculty of Agricultural Sciences and Rural Development
Faculty of Applied Sciences
Faculty of Accounting, Administrative and Economic Sciences
Faculty of Law, Political and Social Sciences
Faculty of Humanities and Education Sciences
Faculty of Sciences, Technologies and Arts
Faculty of Biomedical Sciences

See also 

 List of universities in Paraguay

References

External links 
Universidad Nacional de Pilar

Universities in Paraguay
Ñeembucú Department